Pagalpanti may refer to:
 Pagalpanti (2018 film), an Indian Gujarati-language comedy film
 Pagalpanti (2019 film), an Indian Hindi-language action comedy film

See also 

 Pagal Panthis, peasant movement in Bengal against the British East India Company